"Kozielsk" is also the Polish name for the Russian town of Kozelsk.

Kozielsk  is a village in the administrative district of Gmina Kuczbork-Osada, within Żuromin County, Masovian Voivodeship, in north-central Poland.

References

Villages in Żuromin County